Josh Henson (born July 14, 1975) is an American football coach and former player who is currently the offensive coordinator for the USC Trojans. Henson was previously the offensive line coach for the Texas A&M Aggies.

Early life and education
Josh Henson was born on July 14, 1975, in Tuttle, Oklahoma. After finishing high school, Henson attended Oklahoma State University and played college football there for five years. While at Oklahoma State, Henson started 37 games at offensive line and was named All-Big 12.  Henson graduated from Oklahoma State with a bachelor's degree in secondary education.

Coaching career
After graduating from Oklahoma State, Henson had a one-year stint as an assistant to the Kingfisher High School football team, where he helped the team reach the state semifinals. The next year, Henson became a graduate assistant for Oklahoma State but later he became the tight ends coach at Oklahoma State for the next four years. After four years as tight ends coach for Oklahoma State, Henson became the tight ends coach for LSU. After another four years, Henson left LSU to become the co-offensive line coach and later the offensive coordinator for Missouri. After not being retained as offensive coordinator by the new head coach, Barry Odom, Henson returned to Oklahoma State to become the offensive line coach. Three years after, Henson left to become the offensive line coach for Texas A&M. In 2022, Henson once again got the opportunity to be an offensive coordinator, becoming USC's offensive coordinator under new coach Lincoln Riley.

References

1975 births

Living people
People from Tuttle, Oklahoma
Oklahoma State University alumni
USC Trojans football coaches